Employment and Social Development Canada (ESDC;) is a department of the Government of Canada responsible for social programs and the labour market at the federal level. The department delivers a number of federal government programs and services including Employment Insurance (EI), Service Canada centres, Canada Student Loan Program (CSLP), Canada Pension Plan (CPP), issuing social insurance numbers (SIN) and the federal Labour Program among others things.

History

Background 
The Department of Human Resources and Skills Development was created in December 2003, when Human Resources Development Canada (HRDC) was split into two separate departments: Human Resources and Skills Development Canada (HRSDC) and Social Development Canada (SDC). Though they continued to share many common services and operations, Human Resources and Skills Development Canada was to focus on workforce-related aspects of the former HRDC portfolio, while SDC was to focus on social support programs for children, families and seniors. The split was given formal legal effect when the Department of Human Resources and Skills Development Act and the Department of Social Development Act were enacted in July 2005.

Recombined 
Upon taking office in February 2006, the Conservative government of Stephen Harper announced it would recombine the two departments, and through a series of orders in councils, Social Development Canada was folded into HRSDC.

From 2006 to 2008, Social Development's preceding role was reflected by styling the Minister of Human Resources and Skills Development as the "Minister of Human Resources and Social Development", and by changing the department's applied title to "Human Resources and Social Development Canada". This practice ended in late 2008 when the title was changed to "Minister of Human Resources and Skills Development."  The post was later referred to as "Minister of Employment and Social Development" when the department was renamed.

On November 4, 2015, the department underwent machinery of government changes which saw the employment responsibilities transfer to the Labour Minister resulting in the newly re-titled Minister of Employment, Workforce and Labour. The Social Development aspects were then shaped into the Minister of Families, Children and Social Development. The Minister of Employment, Workforce Development and Disability Inclusion is now tasked with handling the file on persons with disabilities.

Sub-agencies, programs and activities 
Sub-agencies of ESDC include:
Service Canada
Service Canada Centres for Youth
Canada Student Loans Program
Canada Employment Insurance Commission
Canada Pension Plan
National Seniors Council
Seasonal Agricultural Workers Program
Federal Mediation and Conciliation Service
Canada Mortgage and Housing Corporation
Canada Industrial Relations Board

ESDC delivers $87 billion in programs and services and has approximately 24,000 employees. Approximately 19,000 of those employees work under the Service Canada banner.

Officials and structure 
 Minister of Employment, Workforce Development and Disability Inclusion – Carla Qualtrough
 Deputy Minister of Employment and Social Development – Jean-François Tremblay
 Senior Associate Deputy Minister of Employment and Social Development – Kristina Namiesniowski
 Minister of Families, Children and Social Development – Karina Gould
 Senior Associate Deputy Minister of Employment and Social Development and Chief Operating Officer for Service Canada – Lori MacDonald
 Associate Deputy Minister of Employment and Social Development – Annette Gibbons
 Minister of Labour – Seamus O'Regan Jr.
 Deputy Minister of Labour and Associate Deputy Minister of Employment and Social Development – Sandra Hassan
 Kamal Khera – Minister of Seniors

Controversies

2012/2013 privacy breach 

On January 11, 2013, Minister Diane Finley announced that a hard drive containing information of 583,000 student loan borrowers had been lost from a Canada Student Loans Program (CSLP)/HRSDC office in Gatineau, Quebec.  Borrowers who registered a loan between 2000 and 2006 were potentially affected.  The information on the hard drive contained full names, social insurance numbers, contact information, and loan balances.  The hard drive also contained information on 250 HRSDC employees.  Concerns of privacy breaches and identity theft led to the filing of three class-action suits against the federal government on behalf of the affected students.

On January 18, 2013, the Office of the Privacy Commissioner of Canada stated that a formal investigation had been launched.  The stated outcome of this investigation was to provide information to organizations and individuals to improve privacy protection.

The RCMP was notified but is waiting for the outcome of the Office of the Privacy Commissioner of Canada's investigation to do their own investigation.

This incident has become known as "1 in 60", representing the ratio of affected individuals to the Canadian population as a whole.

Canada Summer Jobs program 
In 2018, the government of Justin Trudeau introduced a new mandatory criteria for eligible employers and projects of the Canada Summer Jobs program, for which "the core mandate of the organization must respect individual human rights in Canada, including the values underlying the Canadian Charter of Rights and Freedoms (Charter) as well as other rights" like the "reproductive rights and the right to be free from discrimination". After facing nine ongoing Federal Court challenges and the complaints of the Canadian Conference of Catholic Bishops in union with the Canadian Council of Christian Charities, the requirement was rewritten and became a mandatory point for eligible projects and job activities, which must not "actively work to undermine or restrict a woman's access to sexual and reproductive health services."

See also 
 Poverty in Canada

References

Notes

External links
Official website

 
Federal departments and agencies of Canada
Canada
Canada
Canada
Ministries established in 2003
2003 establishments in Canada
Employment in Canada